Washington Banian is a Papua New Guinean Olympic boxer. He represented his country in the light-flyweight division at the 1988 Summer Olympics. He lost his first bout against Scotty Olson.

1988 Olympic results
Below is the record of Washington Banian, a light flyweight boxer from Papua New Guinea who competed at the 1988 Seoul Olympics:

 Round of 64: bye
 Round of 32: lost to Scotty Olson (Canada) referee stopped contest in the first round

References

External links

1963 births
Living people
Papua New Guinean male boxers
Olympic boxers of Papua New Guinea
Boxers at the 1988 Summer Olympics
Light-flyweight boxers